Burkandul is a village and municipality in the Lerik Rayon of Azerbaijan.  It has a population of 776.  The municipality consists of the villages of Burkandul and Qırxıncı.

References 

Populated places in Lerik District